Elections to the Legislative Assembly of the Indian state of Hyderabad were held and Sri Burgula Rama Krishna Rao took oath as First Chief Minister of Hyderabad State on 6 March 1952. 564 candidates competed for the 175 seats in the Assembly. There were 33 two-member constituencies and 109 constituencies single-member constituencies.

Indian National Congress
The Congress Party won a clear majority of the seats in the assembly (93 seats out of 175), with 41.86% of the popular vote. Prominent Congress MLAs from Hyderabad District included Dr. G. S. Melkote and Gopal Rao Ekbote. Kashinath Rao Vaidya, the Congress MLA from Begum Bazar, was elected Speaker of the Assembly after the election.

People's Democratic Front
The elections were held in the aftermath of the Telangana armed struggle. The communists had called off their guerrilla campaign in October 1951, just few months before the polls. The Communist Party of India was banned in the state at the time, but contested the election under the cover of the People's Democratic Front. The PDF won all of the seats in Nalgonda district.

Socialist Party
The socialists contested 97 seats. However, the result was a set-back for the party with eleven seats won. The party had refused to cooperate with other parties against the Congress, which could have limited their success. Moreover, the party lacked strong leaders and was organizationally weak in the state. The socialist leader Mahadev Singh lost the seat he contested (Secunderabad).

Scheduled Castes Federation
The SCF contested the election in alliance with the PDF.

Muslim candidates
At the time, Muslims represented 7.75% of the population in the state. Out of the main parties, the Indian National Congress had nominated 12 Muslim candidates (6.94% of their candidates), People's Democratic Front had six Muslim candidates (7.69%) whilst the Socialist Party nominated three Muslims (3.09%). Eleven Muslims were elected, below their percentage of the population. Eight of the elected Muslims came from the Indian National Congress, two from the People's Democratic Front (Mohamed Abdur Rahman from Malaket constituency and Syed Akhtar Hussain from Jangaon) and one had contested as an independent (Syed Hasan, Hyderabad City constituency).

Results

Summary

!colspan=8|
|- style="background-color:#E9E9E9; text-align:center;"
! class="unsortable" |
! Political party !! Flag !! Seats  Contested !! Won !! % of  Seats !! Votes !! Vote %
|- style="background: #90EE90;"
| 
| style="text-align:left;" |Indian National Congress
| 
| 173 || 93 || 53.14 || 21,77,716 || 41.86
|-
| 
| style="text-align:left;" |Socialist Party
|
| 97 || 11 || 6.29 || 5,90,209 || 11.35
|-
| 
|
| 77 || 42 || 24.00 || 10,80,092 || 20.76
|-
|
| 
| 24 || 5 || 2.86 || 2,66,482 || 5.12
|-
| 
| style="text-align:left;" |Peasants and Workers Party of India
|
| 21 || 10 || 5.71 || 2,15,992 || 4.15
|-
| 
|
| 136 || 14 || 8.00 || 7,58,318 || 14.58
|- class="unsortable" style="background-color:#E9E9E9"
! colspan = 3| Total seats
! 175 !! style="text-align:center;" |Voters !! 1,21,14,635 !! style="text-align:center;" |Turnout !! 52,02,214 (42.94%)
|}

Party wise results

District wise results
Source : Election Commission of India

List of members
The following is the list of members in the assembly who were elected.

State Reorganization and Merger
On 1 November 1956, under States Reorganisation Act, 1956, Hyderabad State was merged into Andhra State to form a single state Andhra Pradesh. The districts of Raichur, Bidar and Gulbarga were transferred to Mysore State, while Marathwada district was transferred to Bombay State.

See also

 1951–52 elections in India
 1955 Andhra Pradesh Legislative Assembly election
 1957 Andhra Pradesh Legislative Assembly election

References

Hyderabad State
State Assembly elections in Andhra Pradesh
1950s in Andhra Pradesh
Hyderabad
March 1952 events in Asia